Clathrina conifera is a species of calcareous sponge from Brazil. The species name refers to the cone-shaped appearance of the triactines.

Description
Cormus formed of large, irregular and loosely anastomosed tubes, white in life and beige when preserved. Water-collecting tubes are absent. The skeleton is composed only of triactines without any special organisation. They are equiradiate and equiangular. Actines are conical and straight with blunt tips.

References

World Register of Marine Species entry

Clathrina
Fauna of Brazil
Animals described in 2001